Bines is a surname. Notable people with the surname include:

 Julie Bines, Australian paediatric gastroenterologist
 Thomas Bines (died 1826), American politician